The 2010–11 Saint Louis Billikens men's basketball team schedule was released in early August 2010. Rick Majerus is in his 4th season coaching the Billikens. They finished 11–5 in Atlantic 10 Conference and 23–13 overall last season.

Roster

Season schedule

|-
!colspan=12 style=| Exhibition

|-
!colspan=12 style=| Regular season

|-
!colspan=9 style=| Atlantic 10 tournament

References

Saint Louis
Saint Louis Billikens men's basketball seasons
Saint
Saint